Full Circle is the sixth album by Swedish rock band The Quill.

Track listing
"Sleeping With Your Enemy" – 4:35 
"Full Circle" – 4:26 
"Black Star" – 3:42
"Medicine" – 3:56
"Bring It On" – 3:39
"River Of A Moonchild" – 4:20 
"24/7 Groove" – 3:32 
"White Flag" – 3:27 
"Pace That Kills" – 4:12 
"No Easy Way Out" – 5:41
"Running" – 4:13
"More Alive" – 4:58
"Waiting For The Sun" – 4:01

Personnel

The Quill
 Magnus Arnar - Vocals
 Christian Carlsson - Guitar
 Robert Triches - Bass
 George "Jolle" Atlagic - Drums

Additional personnel
 Conny Bloom - Sitar on "Black Star"

References

External links
 Full Circle at Encyclopaedia Metallum
 Full Circle at Discogs

2011 albums
The Quill (band) albums